Chimundo is a village in Mozambique. It is located in the Chibuto District in the province of Gaza.

Chibuto District
Populated places in Gaza Province